The Church of St Peter is a Church of England Grade II* listed church located on the east side of Wallsend, North Tyneside. It was constructed to replace Holy Cross Church, which had been built c. 1150 but had fallen into disrepair by the end of the eighteenth century. The building was extensively remodeled in 1892 in the Perpendicular style to give it its present form. The parish church oldest in Wallsend

History
By the 1790s the local authorities agreed a new church needed to be constructed, since Holy Cross Church, which had served the Wallsend community for centuries, had fallen into disrepair. With the only local church both roofless and unusable, services were instead being conducted in the local schoolroom. 
Progress was slow, however, with disagreements between Church and local property owners as to who should finance the construction, stalling the project until 1804. The matter was eventually resolved by a solicitor who suggested the money could be raised by means of a tontine. This unusual solution proved popular and ensured the necessary funds became available.

No work was undertaken however until 1806, when it was realised that the schoolroom being used for public worship was neither consecrated nor licensed —meaning that marriages were not legal, the offspring of the unions illegitimate and the perpetual curate subject to serious legal penalties. A Bill was passed in the House of Commons in August 1807 in order to legitimise the marriages and their offspring, and to authorise the construction of a new church. The foundation stone of what would be a Georgian 'preaching box' was laid in November 1807 and the burial ground was consecrated in 1809. Major alterations were made in 1892 to give the church its current form.

It was clear by the 1980s that the Victorian chancel had serious structural problems, and questions were raised with regard to the feasibility of making the necessary repairs. At one point the church was threatened with closure. But during Fr Alan Clements's tenure (1995-2001) substantial grants were secured from English Heritage and the Heritage Lottery Fund. These enabled the chancel to be given robust foundations and all the attendant repairs to be made. The scheme entailed turning the chancel into a church hall, the Lady Chapel into a sacristy, and the vestries into a kitchen and cloakrooms.
In 2001 The parish was amalgamated with that of St Luke, Wallsend into a single parish.

Tradition
In the early years of Fr Armstrong's incumbency (1830-1871) the thinking of the Oxford Movement began to shape the life of the church, albeit strongly resisted initially by some parishioners. He was accused of having 'an exaggerated idea of the priesthood' and 'more zeal for ceremony than for vital religion'—both common accusations against clergy who accepted Tractarian thinking. But his determination over forty years laid the foundations on which his successors would build. The church maintains the tradition of Anglo-Catholicism today.

Stained Glass
One of the most notable features of the church is its collection of vivid stained glass by members of the Tower of Glass movement of the early 20th century.
In 2017, Thomas Denny made and fitted the 'Stella Maris' window in the westernmost window on the south side of the nave. It is a belated thanksgiving for the church's bicentenary in 2009, paid for entirely by fundraising and gifts. It was dedicated on 6 May, the feast of St Eadfrith

Other notable features 
The font originally stood in Holy Cross Church, and would have been use by monks from Jarrow to baptise babies born in Wallsend. At some point after Holy Cross was abandoned the font found its way into Wallsend Burn (the stream which now forms the parish's northern boundary). It was rescued from there at some point in the 1800s and taken to Carville Hall, and eventually given to St Peter's by Mr Wigham Richardson in 1891.

The pipe organ is a Harrison & Harrison instrument of the Thomas Harrison period (1892).

The image of St Peter the Apostle to the north of the High Altar was commissioned by Fr Peter Strange.

Outside is a set of stocks, originally installed to discourage Sabbath-breaking. They are occasionally used for novelty wedding photographs.

Buried in unmarked graves in the churchyard are many victims of mining disasters, with memorial plaques commemorating both the Heaton Main Colliery Disaster of 1815 and the Wallsend Colliery Disaster of 1835. There is also an old chest identified on Antiques Roadshow as  Nonsuch Chest from. The 1580s built by immigrants and decorated with copies of plans from the palace Henry v111 built in Surrey it no longer exists but afew chest were known 1in the V & A and one in Southwark Cathedral both in much better condition than ours but at least it was saved from the tip! .

Clergy
The souls of Wallsend were ministered to from an early stage by monks crossing the Tyne from St Paul's, Jarrow, one half of the Benedictine house of Monkwearmouth–Jarrow Abbey. From the Reformation until 1856 the parish priest was a perpetual curate, whereafter he became a titular rector by Orders in Council. The incumbent of the parish created by the amalgamation of Wallsend St Peter and Wallsend St Luke is its rector.

Perpetual Curates
 1541-1565  George Winter
 1565-1598  Richard Raye
 1598-1599  John Philpot
 1599-1603  Richard Dearham
 1603-1605  Richard Chambers
 1605-1620  John Todd
 1620-1628  George Rayne
 1628-1664  Joseph Craddock
 1664-1683  Anthony Proctor
 1685-1703  Thomas Teasdale
 1703-1718  Thomas Dockwray
 1718-1759  Thomas Dockwray
 1760-1789  Emmanuel Potter
 1789-1830  Robert Blackett
 1830-1856  John Armstrong
Rectors of Wallsend St Peter
 1856-1871  John Armstrong
 1872-1886  Richard Jenkins
 1886-1906  James Henderson
 1906-1936  Charles Osborne
 1936-1943  Frank Hurst
 1944-1969  Cecil Davis
 1970-1979  David McCubbin
 1979-1986  Peter Strange
 1986-1992  John Dewar
Priests-in-Charge of Wallsend St Peter
 1992-1994  John Ross
 1995-2001  Alan Clements
  2021       alan Paterson
Rectors of Wallsend St Peter & St Luke
 2002-2011  Michael Vine
 2012-2019  David Sudron
Assistant Curates
 1932-1937 Reginald Lee
 1938-1941 Herbert Lenygon
 1941-1943 Cheslyn Jones
 1944-1948 William Nicholson
 1948-1952 Colin Turnbull
 1949-1954 Richard Norgate
 1954-1958 David Moll
 1956-1960 John Moore
 1958-1963 Geoffrey Ashford
 1960-1964 Colin Scott
 1963-1966 Angus Palmer
 1967-1969 Richard Jones
 2006-2007 Stephen Gilham
2016-2020 Endre Kormos

Today

The former chancel is used for social gatherings, and can be hired by local groups.

References

Wallsend
Churches completed in 1909
Wallsend
Grade II* listed churches in Tyne and Wear
Wallsend